Ilene Erskine (7 August 1933 — 28 December 2018) was a Scottish educational psychologist, artist and printmaker.

Following a career in educational psychology, Erskine returned to study as mature student at Edinburgh College of Art, graduating in 1991 with a BA Hons Sculpture. Erskine was best known as a printmaker, specialising in intaglio etching using a three-plate printing process, a technically challenging technique that creates rich depth of colour. Her subjects were mainly domestic: interiors, still lives, bric-a-brac and flowers.

Erskine was a member of the Edinburgh Printmakers Workshop and Visual Arts Scotland.

References 

1933 births
2018 deaths
20th-century Scottish women artists
21st-century Scottish women artists
Alumni of the Edinburgh College of Art
People from Falkirk